Cabinet Inlet is an icy inlet,  long in a northwest–southeast direction, and some  wide at its entrance between Cape Alexander and Cape Robinson, along the east coast of Graham Land, Antarctica. It was named and charted by the Falkland Islands Dependencies Survey (FIDS) and aerially photographed by the Ronne Antarctic Research Expedition in December 1947. It is named for the British War Cabinet which authorized the FIDS in 1943.

Further reading 
 Suzanne L. Bevan, Adrian Luckman, Bryn Hubbard, Bernd Kulessa, David Ashmore, Peter Kuipers Munneke, Martin O’Leary, Adam Booth, Heidi Sevestre, and Daniel McGrath, Intense Winter Surface Melt on an Antarctic Ice Shelf, Geophysical Research Letters, 45. https://doi.org/10.1029/2018GL077899 
 Suzanne L. Bevan, Adrian Luckman, Bryn Hubbard, Bernd Kulessa, David Ashmore, Peter Kuipers Munneke, Martin O’Leary, Adam Booth, Heidi Sevestre, and Daniel McGrath, Centuries of intense surface melt on Larsen C Ice Shelf, The Cryosphere, 11, 2743–2753, 2017 https://doi.org/10.5194/tc-11-2743-2017

References 
 

Inlets of Graham Land
Foyn Coast